Alexander Ivanovich Marinesko (– 25 November 1963) was a Soviet naval officer and, during World War II, the captain of the submarine S-13 which sank the German military transport ship Wilhelm Gustloff. The most successful Soviet submarine commander in terms of gross register tonnage (GRT) sunk, with 42,000 GRT to his name, he was posthumously awarded the title Hero of the Soviet Union in 1990.

Early life
Born in Odessa, Marinesko was the son of a Romanian sailor, Ion Marinescu, and a Ukrainian woman, Tatiana Mihailovna Koval from Kherson Governorate. His father had fled to the Russian Empire after beating an officer and settled in Odessa, Ukrainizing his name to Ivan and changing the last letter "u" of his surname to "o".

Marinesko trained in the Soviet Merchant Navy and the Black Sea Fleet, and was later moved to a command position in the Baltic Fleet. He was promoted to lieutenant (ensign) in March 1936 and advanced to senior lieutenant (sub-lieutenant) in November 1938. In the summer of 1939 he was appointed commander of the new submarine M-96. When it entered service in mid-1940, it was declared to be the best submarine of the Baltic Fleet. Marinesko was awarded a golden watch and promoted to captain-lieutenant (капитан-лейтенант, equivalent to Lieutenant Commander (LCDR/O-4) in the USN) in 1940.

World War II 
Nazi Germany attacked USSR in June 1941. The Soviet high command of the Baltic Fleet decided that the M-96 should be sent to the Caspian Sea to serve there as a training boat. But this could not be realized because of the German blockade of Leningrad. On 12 February 1942, a German artillery shell hit M-96, causing considerable damage.

In the beginning of 1943, Marinesko was appointed commander of the modernized submarine S-13. Of the 13 units of the Type S (Stalinets), Series IX and IXbis, only this boat survived the war.

Wilhelm Gustloff and Steuben 

Marinesko left Porkkala Naval Base on 11 January 1945 and took position near Kolberg on January 13. During the next few days his submarine was attacked several times by German torpedo boats. On 30 January 1945, S-13 attacked and sank the Wilhelm Gustloff, which was evacuating civilians, mostly families with children and military personnel from East Prussia. There were probably 9,400 casualties.

Days later, on 10 February, Marinesko sank a second German ship with two torpedoes, the Steuben, carrying mostly wounded military personnel, and over 800 civilians, evacuating East Prussia and Memel (now Klaipėda) with an estimated total number of 4,267 casualties. Marinesko thus became the most successful Soviet submarine commander in terms of gross register tonnage (GRT) sunk, with 42,000 GRT to his name.

Before sinking the Wilhelm Gustloff, Alexander Marinesko was facing a court martial due to his problems with alcohol and was thus deemed "not suitable to be a hero". He was instead awarded the Order of the Red Banner. He was downgraded in rank to lieutenant and dishonorably discharged from the navy in October 1945. In 1960 he was reinstated as captain third class and granted a full pension. In 1963 Marinesko was given the traditional ceremony due to a captain upon his successful return from a mission. He died three weeks later on 25 November 1963 from cancer, and was buried at the Bogoslovskoe Cemetery in St. Petersburg. Marinesko was posthumously awarded Hero of the Soviet Union by Mikhail Gorbachev in 1990 after rehabilitation by the newspaper Izvestia.

Legacy

In 1990 Ulitsa Stroitelei (Builders' Street) in St. Petersburg was renamed in his honor to Ulitsa Marinesko, located in Kirovskiy District, connecting Avtovskaya and Zaitseva streets. The Museum of Russian Submarine Forces in St. Petersburg was named after him,  and monuments dedicated to him were erected in Kaliningrad, Kronstadt, and Odessa. He is one of the more prominent characters in the Günter Grass' novel Crabwalk (2002), which describes in detail the sinking of the Wilhelm Gustloff.

Honours and awards 

Hero of the Soviet Union
Two Orders of Lenin
Two Orders of the Red Banner
Medal "For Military Merit"
Medal "For the Defence of Leningrad"
Medal "For the Victory over Germany in the Great Patriotic War 1941–1945"
Medal "In Commemoration of the 250th Anniversary of Leningrad"

References 

1913 births
1963 deaths
Heroes of the Soviet Union
Recipients of the Order of the Red Banner
Military personnel from Odesa
Soviet military personnel of World War II
Soviet submarine commanders
Ukrainian people of Romanian descent
Ukrainian people of World War II
Soviet people of Romanian descent
Deaths from cancer in the Soviet Union
Burials at Bogoslovskoe Cemetery
Deaths from cancer in Russia